"Crush (1980 Me)" is the fourth and final overall single released by Australian singer-songwriter Darren Hayes from his debut studio album, Spin. It reached number 19 on the UK Singles Chart. In Australia, it was released as the third single from the album in September 2002, prior to the release of "I Miss You", which was released in early 2003. The song is an homage to the 1980s, featuring a 1980s synthesized pop sound, vocoded vocals and referencing many stars such as Cyndi Lauper, Simon Le Bon and Eurythmics. Samples of "Holiday", the 1983 hit song of Madonna, were used in the remix "Crush on Holiday", which became the main airplay and video version in Australia.

Music video
The music video is set in the mid-1980s and features Hayes in an outdoor cinema playing Space Invaders. The clip introduces the names of people including Hayes, Corey, a guy who thinks he's cool, Cyndi, Corey's girlfriend who adores Hayes, and Martha, a shy girl on the counter. Outside the bar, there are many people break-dancing and skateboarding. A crowd are amazed with Hayes' performance on Space Invaders and he breaks a record by getting to the hundredth level. After the game, Hayes chooses Martha over Cyndi and both of them enjoy a movie in the evening as a shooting star ends the clip.

Charts

Track listings
 Australia – first pressing
"Crush (1980 Me)" (album version) – 4:01
"Crush (1980 Me)" (Mayday Disco Biscuit Mix) – 3:08
"Strange Relationship" (F3 Mix) – 3:41
"Right Dead Back on It" (original demo recording) (Featuring Elisa Fiorillo) – 3:49
"Insatiable" (acoustic version – Live in the Capital Radio Living Room) – 5:22

 Australia – second pressing
"Crush (1980 Me)" (album version) – 4:01
"Crush (1980 Me)" (Mayday Disco Biscuit Mix) – 3:08
"Strange Relationship" (F3 Mix) – 3:41
"Insatiable" (acoustic version – Live in the Capital Radio Living Room) – 5:22

 UK CD1
"Crush (1980 Me)" (album version) – 4:01
"Crush (1980 Me)" (Mayday Disco Biscuit Mix) – 3:08
"I Miss You" (Dallas Austin Mix) – 3:28
"Crush (1980 Me)" (video) – 4:06

 UK CD2
"Crush (1980 Me)" (radio edit) – 3:58
"Crush (1980 Me)" (Crush on Holiday Mix) – 4:24
"Crush (1980 Me)" (instrumental version) – 4:01

References

External links
Darren Hayes – "Crush (1980 Me)" music video
Darren Hayes' official site

2002 singles
2003 singles
Darren Hayes songs
Songs written by Darren Hayes
Songs written by Robert Conley (music producer)
2002 songs
Columbia Records singles